Jiangyin Stadium is a multi-purpose stadium in Jiangyin, China.  It is currently used mostly for football matches.  The stadium holds 30,161 spectators. It opened in 2010. It is one of the neutral venues being used for the 2021 Chinese Super League.

References

Football venues in China
Multi-purpose stadiums in China
Sports venues in Jiangsu